The 1966 United States Senate election in Alaska was held on November 8, 1966. Incumbent Democratic U.S. Senator Bob Bartlett was re-elected to a third term in office in a landslide, defeating Republican dentist Lee McKinley in a rematch of their 1960 race. Bartlett would not complete the term, dying in office on December 11th, 1968, following complications after heart surgery. Ted Stevens would be elected to succeed Bartlett, and would serve for 40 years in the U.S. Senate. This was the last time until 2008 that a Democrat was elected to Alaska's Class 2 Senate seat.

Open primary

Candidates

Democratic
Bob Bartlett, incumbent Senator
T. J. Bichsel
David Boyer, candidate for Governor of Alaska in 1962
Robert L. Veach

Republican
Lawrence M. Brayton, candidate for Senate in 1960
 Lee McKinley, dentist and Republican nominee for Senate in 1960
Maxine B. Whaley

Results

General election

Results

See also 
 1966 United States Senate elections

References 

Alaska
1966
1966 Alaska elections